Protective laws were enacted to protect women from certain hazards or difficulties of paid work. These laws had the effect of reducing the employment available to women, saving it for men. These were enacted in many jurisdictions in the United States, and some were in effect until the mid or late 20th century. The landmark case Muller v. Oregon set a precedent to use sex differences as a basis for separate legislation.

The name is not a formal one but is a widely-used colloquial term, as was the term protective legislation.

Range of laws 
Over laws affected work hours, wages, occupational choice, mandatory seating, homework, and rights to do business and make contracts. Specifically, various laws required a minimum wage for women and children (criticized because women allegedly did not need the money, the minimum wage was opposed for men and ruled unlawful in 1923) and forbade or regulated lifting heavy loads, working at night or for long hours, or tending bar and required some safety and breaks from work for rest, lunch, and bathroom use. The ban on long hours often denied the possibility of earning overtime pay. Some of the laws were irrelevant to work but were intended to protect women's ability to become mothers and not be subject to sexual issues that were often categorized as moral issues.

Rationale for passage 
Protection of women was a rationale for the enactment of the laws. Women were considered more vulnerable than men in factories and sweatshops, and one supporter of the laws was the Amalgamated Clothing Workers, a labor organization, which supported the laws for nonmembers of unions. Some supporters in unions and women's organizations, concerned that courts in the 1950s would oppose pro-labor legislation generally, wanted to preserve whatever such laws were already in place. By 1972, however, the year the Equal Rights Amendment (ERA) to the U.S. Constitution passed the Congress and was proposed to the states for ratification, unions supported the ERA and considered female-only protective laws as against women's interests.

Another rationale was put forth by an organization which, in 1836, adopted a resolution that said, "Whereas, Labor is a physical and moral injury to women and a competitive menace to men, we recommend legislation to restrict women in industry."

The minimum wage was supported except for men because of "widespread agreement that the labor market did not function effectively where women and the family were concerned" and among feminists because women needed to support their own dependents.

Criticisms 
They were criticized on several grounds.
 They failed to require protection from the hazards or difficulties for all workers who needed those protections.
 They denied jobs to women who did not need the protections at all or needed the jobs more than the protections and could make that choice.
 Many denied jobs rather than required changes, either at the workplaces or elsewhere, that would have reduced any reason for protection.
 Few, if any, of these laws applied to women's unpaid work at home or with families, which could be more hazardous or difficult than some of the restricted employments.
 Some women may have advocated for such laws, but many were put into effect when women did not have the vote or the right to hold electoral office, so the people ultimately responsible for legislating them were almost exclusively men, and they were responding to voters who were men.
 The laws disincentivized employers from hiring women.

Protective labor laws were criticized because they excluded women from prestigious well-paid male-dominated occupations, and they confined women's work to the home, thus reinforcing Separate Spheres ideology and the Cult of Domesticity.

An opponent of these laws was the National Woman's Party (NWP), which led support for the Equal Rights Amendment. It opposed the laws as interfering with women's right to make contracts and as preventing them from offering their full capabilities at work, objecting, for example, to a 20-pound limit on lifting, if a woman wanted that job and could lift the weight.

Modernity 
Eventually, most or all were amended, repealed, ruled unconstitutional (i.e., in violation of the US Constitution and thus invalid), or not enforced anymore because they singled women out for unequal treatment. (Laws in the US may not be enforced if they are unconstitutional or otherwise unauthorized in law.) Had the Equal Rights Amendment to the Constitution been enacted in the 1970s or the 1980s, it was believed the laws would have been invalidated by the amendment and subsequent litigation and, as a result, most liberal organizations opposed the amendment. The laws had earlier been supported by social feminists for decades.

Some of the laws have been replaced by laws that apply to both genders, such as the Occupational Safety and Health Act.

An argument for protective laws still sometimes arises, as with debates over the US military's continuing legal ban on women in certain combat positions, when it is argued that the ban should remain in effect because women might be killed or raped.

Worldwide 
Besides the United States, many others may have laws with comparable intent or effect and that constrain employment of women or of other groups of adults defined by characteristics at birth, although the laws may not be called by the same name.

In Egypt, around the 1920s, the Egyptian Feminist Union advocated for protective legislation.

See also
 Mothers' pensions
 Sheppard-Towner Act

Footnotes

Further reading
 Nancy Woloch, A Class by Herself: Protective Laws for Women Workers, 1890s-1990s. Princeton, NJ: Princeton University Press, 2015.

Anti-discrimination law in the United States
Feminism and society
History of women's rights in the United States
Sexism